The 1949 Western Reserve Red Cats football team represented the Western Reserve University in the American city of Cleveland, Ohio, now known as Case Western Reserve University, during the 1949 college football season.  The Red Cats were a member of the Mid-American Conference (MAC).

The team was coached by Mike Scarry, a former Cleveland Browns player who played under and learned his coaching style from Paul Brown.  Assistant coaches were Dick Luther and Lou Zontini.

1949 was the last season both Western Reserve University and Case Institute of Technology used League Park for their home football games, relocating to Shaw Stadium in 1950.  In fact, the Thanksgiving Day rivalry game on November 24, 1949 was the final football game ever played at League Park.

Schedule

References

Western Reserve
Case Western Reserve Spartans football seasons
Western Reserve Red Cats football